Imparietula is a genus of gastropods belonging to the family Enidae.

The species of this genus are found in Southeastern Mediterranean.

Species:

Imparietula altenai 
Imparietula inflexa 
Imparietula lasistanica 
Imparietula leucodon 
Imparietula microdon 
Imparietula pelidne 
Imparietula ridvani 
Imparietula schelkovnikovi

References

Enidae